Peter Pearless (born 4 June 1957) is a New Zealand middle-distance runner. He competed in the men's 800 metres at the 1984 Summer Olympics.

References

1957 births
Living people
Athletes (track and field) at the 1984 Summer Olympics
New Zealand male middle-distance runners
Olympic athletes of New Zealand
Place of birth missing (living people)